Allen Nicholas Farnham (born May 19, 1961) is a record producer, educator, jazz pianist, composer, and arranger. He has recorded several albums under his own name – as a soloist, in a small group, and with a big band.

Early life
Farnham was born in Boston on May 19, 1961. He "first played piano when he was 12 and in 1983 he graduated from the Oberlin Conservatory of Music in Ohio".

Later life and career
Farnham moved to New York City in the following year. He played as a freelance, then signed to Concord Records in 1986. "Between 1986 and 1990 he led his own quartet, with either Joe Lovano or Dick Oatts on saxophone and Drew Gress and Jamey Haddad filling out the rhythm section, and from 1990 he was pianist and music director for Susannah McCorkle."

Farnham has produced more than 50 albums for Concord. He is a faculty member at New Jersey City University.

Discography

As leader/co-leader

As sideman

Main source:

References

1961 births
American jazz pianists
American male pianists
Living people
Musicians from Boston
New Jersey City University faculty
Oberlin Conservatory of Music alumni
Jazz musicians from Massachusetts
21st-century American pianists
21st-century American male musicians
American male jazz musicians